Corcovado is a genus of longhorn beetles of the subfamily Lamiinae, containing the following species:

 Corcovado bezarki Martins & Galileo, 2008
 Corcovado peruviense Lane, 1973
 Corcovado ruber (Bates, 1881)

References

Hemilophini
Cerambycidae genera